Poria comprises three adjacent villages south of Tiberias in northern Israel, specifically  Poria – Neve Oved, Poria Illit, and Poria – Kfar Avoda.  Each is a community settlement and all three lie along Route 768 overlooking the Sea of Galilee.   the cumulative population was 1875.

External links
Poria – Neve Oved Galilee Development Authority 
Poria Illit Galilee Development Authority 
Poria – Kfar Avoda Galilee Development Authority 

Community settlements
Populated places in Northern District (Israel)
Sea of Galilee